Roger Conant may refer to:

 Roger Conant (colonist) (c. 1592–1679), leader of the company of fishermen who founded Salem, Massachusetts
 Sir Roger Conant, 1st Baronet (1899–1973), British Conservative Party politician
 Roger Conant (herpetologist) (1909–2003), American herpetologist, author, educator and conservationist

See also
Conant (disambiguation)